Sant Esteve (Catalan for Saint Stephen) may refer to:

Places

Spain
Església de Sant Esteve
Església de Sant Esteve de Bixessarri
Sant Esteve de Banyoles
Sant Esteve de Palautordera
Sant Esteve de la Sarga
Sant Esteve Sesrovires